Arizona's 3rd Legislative District is one of 30 in the state, situated entirely in northwest Pima County. As of 2021, there are 41 precincts in the district, with a total registered voter population of 109,112. The district has an overall population of 215,660.

Political representation
The district is represented for the 2021–2022 Legislative Session in the State Senate by Sally Ann Gonzales (D) and in the House of Representatives by Andrés Cano (D) and Alma Hernandez (D).

See also
 List of Arizona Legislative Districts
 Arizona State Legislature

References

Pima County, Arizona
Arizona legislative districts